The Cyprus Development Bank (CDB), (Κυπριακή Τράπεζα Αναπτύξεως), is a development bank that was established in 1963 as a public company to promote economic development in Cyprus.

Its main shareholders were the Republic of Cyprus and the European Investment Bank. It was privatized in 2008.

History
The Cyprus Development Bank was established in 1963 as a public company with shareholders as the Republic of Cyprus and the European Investment Bank.

In June 2007, the Government of Cyprus invited expressions of interest on Friday to dispose of its majority stake. CDB’s assets in 2007 stand at CYP £231 million.
In 2008 the bank was fully privatized and no longer belongs to the Cypriot state.

References

External links
Bank Profile: The Cyprus Development Bank Public Company Ltd

Banks established in 1963
1963 establishments in Cyprus
Companies based in Nicosia
Banks of Cyprus
Companies listed on the Cyprus Stock Exchange